C. juncea may refer to:

 Canna juncea, a garden plant
 Carmichaelia juncea, a New Zealand broom
 Ceropegia juncea, a lantern flower
 Chionochloa juncea, a tussock grass
 Chondrilla juncea, a noxious weed
 Conostylis juncea, a perennial herb
 Coronilla juncea, a North African plant
 Crotalaria juncea, an Asian legume